Hunaid Lakhani (died 8 September 2022) was a Pakistani politician, and the founder of Iqra University.

Lakhani  was a Pakistan Tehreek-e-Insaf (PTI) leader, and the chairman of Baitul Mal Sindh.

He died on 8 September 2022 at 49 years of age in Karachi.

References

1970s births
2022 deaths
Year of birth missing
Founders of universities
Pakistan Tehreek-e-Insaf politicians